Friedrich Ernst Koch (3 July 1862 – 30 January 1927) was a German composer, cellist and teacher.

Biography
He was born in Berlin and studied cello with Robert Hausmann and composition with Woldemar Bargiel at the Berlin Hochschule für Musik. He served as a cellist in the Royal Orchestra of Berlin between 1882 and 1891, after which he accepted a position of music director (Kapellmeister) for the resort town of Baden-Baden. A year later, he returned to Berlin, where he concentrated on composing and teaching, eventually becoming a professor and director of theory at the Musikhochschule where he had studied. Kurt Weill, Pablo Sorozábal, Boris Blacher and Paul Kletzki were among his many students.

His compositions, which were often based on German folk melodies and written in a late Romantic style, gained him considerable recognition and acclaim. His metier was the character piece at which he excelled. Although he did not write much in the way of chamber music, these works were among his best compositions. His string trio, op. 9, won the Mendelssohn Prize and his Wald-Idyll (Forest Idyll), Three Fantasy Pieces for piano trio, op. 20, dating from 1902, enjoyed frequent concert performances right up until the Second World War.   There is also a violin sonata in A minor (op. 47) published by C. F. Kahnt in 1925.

He composed two symphonies, in D minor Von der Nordsee (op. 4) and G (op. 10, published 1891).

References

The New Grove Dictionary of Music, Ed. Stanley Sadie, Macmillan, London, 1980.
Cobbett's Cyclopedic Survey of Chamber Music, Oxford University Press, London, 1963.

External links
Friedrich Koch Wald-Idyll for Piano Trio, Op.20 sound-bites and discussion of work

1862 births
1927 deaths
19th-century German musicians
19th-century German male musicians
German composers
German male composers
German classical cellists
Mendelssohn Prize winners
Musicians from Berlin